National Tertiary Route 314, or just Route 314 (or ) is a National Road Route of Costa Rica, located in the San José province.

Description
In San José province the route covers Puriscal canton (Santiago, San Rafael districts).

References

Highways in Costa Rica